Greens Branch is a  long 2nd order tributary to Duck Creek in Kent County, Delaware.

Variant names
According to the Geographic Names Information System, it has also been known historically as:  
Duck Creek

Course
Greens Branch rises on the Providence Creek divide about 0.2 miles southwest of Alley Corners, Delaware.

Watershed
Greens Branch drains  of area, receives about 44.7 in/year of precipitation, has a topographic wetness index of 644.03 and is about 2.8% forested.

See also
List of rivers of Delaware

References 

Rivers of Delaware
Rivers of New Castle County, Delaware